Blaine Township is a township in Marion County, Kansas, United States.  As of the 2010 census, the township population was 185, including the city of Tampa.

Geography

Communities
The township contains the following settlements:
 City of Tampa.

Cemeteries
The township contains the following cemeteries:
 Hackler Cemetery (aka Tampa Cemetery), located in Section 24 T17S R2E.

There are nearby cemeteries north in Banner Township, Dickinson County, Kansas:
 College Hill Cemetery.

Transportation
K-15 highway passes north to south through the township.

References

Further reading

External links
 Marion County website
 City-Data.com
 Marion County maps: Current, Historic, KDOT

Townships in Marion County, Kansas
Townships in Kansas